Amirabad-e Fenderesk (also Romanized as Amīrābād-e Fenderesk) is a village in Katul Rural District, in the Central District of Aliabad County, Golestan Province, Iran. At the 2006 census, its population was 314, in 93 families.

References 

Populated places in Aliabad County